Robert Cunliffe (died 4 December 1653) was an English politician who sat in the House of Commons  in 1653

Cunliffe was of Sparth in Clayton in the Moors, Lancashire and was an active parliamentarian. He was one of commissioners for sequestration for Lancashire in 1643 . In 1653, he was nominated as  Member of Parliament for Lancashire in the Barebones Parliament. He died eight days before the dissolution of the parliament in 1653.

His only daughter married John Grimshaw son of John Grimshaw of Glayton Hall.

References

Year of birth missing
1653 deaths
English MPs 1653 (Barebones)
Members of the Parliament of England (pre-1707) for Lancashire